The 1947 Nebraska Cornhuskers football team represented the University of Nebraska as a member of the Big Six Conference during the 1947 college football season. Led by Bernie Masterson in his second and final season as head coach, the Cornhuskers compiled an overall record of 2–7 with a mark of 2–3 in conference play, placing fourth in the Big 6. Nebraska played home games at Memorial Stadium in Lincoln, Nebraska.

Before the season
Head coach Masterson, hired last year to restore the T formation offense, and Nebraska's historic dominance that had faded over the past several years, returned in his attempt to stem the program's unprecedented string of losing seasons at six.  Never before this stretch had the Cornhuskers ever had even two consecutive losing football seasons, and as the fifth head coach of the Cornhuskers in the last eleven years, and with four of the six 1946 assistants departed and replaced with three new position coaches, turnover and instability at the top that had likely contributed to the long run of frustration was still a concern.  It remained to be seen whether coach Masterson would be up to the challenge of Nebraska's recovery.

Schedule

Roster

Coaching staff

Game summaries

Indiana

The Hoosiers, long a source of frustration for Nebraska, continued their string of wins in the series by blanking the Cornhuskers to start coach Masterson's second season with a sound defeat.  Though Nebraska once held the edge over Indiana at 3–0–2, the Hoosiers had run off seven wins straight to take command of the series.

Minnesota

The Cornhuskers sought to bounce back from the season opening loss, yet initially found themselves behind 0–14 against longtime rival Minnesota.  Nebraska overcame the deficit as the game wore on, eventually drawing up within one point of the Golden Gophers in the fourth quarter, but Minnesota poured on the pressure and put away two more touchdowns to seal the game and take their 7th straight victory in the series, improving their edge over the Cornhuskers to 23–4–2.

Iowa State

Underdog Iowa State made their first serious attempt to get a win against Nebraska in several years, and rolled up the statistical advantage for their efforts, yet did not actually obtain the points to match.  It was the bad luck of the Cyclones that a blocked punt was recovered by the Cornhuskers to put up the winning points and secure the first Nebraska win of the season and snap their three-game losing streak in the series.  Iowa State fell to 8–32–1 against the Cornhuskers overall.

Notre Dame

After a long, twenty-six year layoff, Nebraska and Notre Dame finally resumed their series tied at 5–5–1 since their last meeting in 1925.  Both schools hoped that the cultural aftereffects of the war in Europe would put to bed the hate-filled interactions that ended the series twenty years prior.  Unlike their last meeting, however, Notre Dame was still in the position as national power and ranked #2 entering the game, while the Cornhuskers remained in the throes of trying to recover from a six-season slide.  Thus it was not much of a surprise when Nebraska ended the day at Notre Dame Stadium with a shutout loss to the Fighting Irish in front of one of the largest crowds that the Cornhuskers had played in front of in many years.  Despite the score, the game should have been closer than it seemed, but numerous scoring opportunities handed to Nebraska were time and again wasted on fumbles and other errors, putting Notre Dame in charge of the series for the first time since 1924.  Notre Dame went on to finish 1947 unbeaten at 9–0 and shared the national title with Michigan.

Kansas State

Nebraska was unable to finally put points up until the second half, but by holding Kansas State to a single touchdown, the Cornhuskers remained perfect in conference play.  This was the fifth straight win for Nebraska in the series as the Cornhuskers improved over the Wildcats to 26–4–2 overall.

Missouri

Hopes for a respectable season began to crumble when the mighty Missouri football squad crushed Nebraska in Columbia.  With Tiger starters pulled from the game, the Cornhuskers were still unable to prevent the Missouri backups from putting three scores up in the final quarter.  Only a third-quarter touchdown prevented the insult of a shutout loss.  It was Missouri's eighth win in the last ten meetings of the teams, but the Tigers were still ten wins behind in the series at 24–34–3.  The Missouri-Nebraska Victory Bell was re-introduced after a period of inactivity during World War II, but the series trophy remained in custody of Missouri after the game.

Kansas

Kansas managed to secure a rare win in Lincoln with a touchdown punched through Nebraska's defenses in the final 40 seconds of the contest to deny celebration to the crowd of 22,000 present for the Cornhusker homecoming game.  The Jayhawks went on to finish the season 8–0–2 and ranked 12th by the AP Poll, sharing the Big 6 championship with Oklahoma.  Nebraska's firm series ownership was still safe at 40–11–3.

Oklahoma

Oklahoma snatched away their fifth straight win over Nebraska in a hard fought contest decided by a single missed conversion in the second quarter.  Attempts by both teams to decide the game in the fourth quarter were turned away.  The Cornhuskers still owned a 16–8–3 edge in the series, though the Sooners were slowly and steadily chipping away at the lead.  Oklahoma went on to finish 1947 with a 7–2–1 record, a #16 AP Poll ranking, and shared the Big 6 title with Kansas.

Oregon State

The Oregon State Beavers had not met Nebraska on the field since 1936, and arrived in Lincoln with several losses behind them, leading some to assume the Cornhuskers would not have serious trouble securing a season-ending win.  Someone forget to tell Oregon State that they were supposed to lose, however, and the Beavers spent the day romping and outplaying the Nebraska squad in every way.  The Cornhuskers managed just a single touchdown as Oregon State out-rushed them 190–42 and out-passed them 254–31.  It was a harsh ending to Nebraska's season, as the Beavers secured their first win in the series after six attempts.

After the season
Head coach Masterson's second season was step backwards for a team already in a record-setting slide.  This was the seventh losing season in a row, and coach Masterson's first head coaching position became his last.  His overall coaching career of 5–13–0 (.278) was the third-lowest in program history to date, though his Big 6 record broke even at 5–5–0 (.500).  Nebraska's overall record slipped to 314–140–31 (.679) and the Cornhuskers Big 6 total also fell slightly, to 118–33–11 (.762).  Another coaching change was upon Nebraska, where the continuing turnover was causing harm but could not be avoided.

References

Nebraska
Nebraska Cornhuskers football seasons
Nebraska Cornhuskers football